First Lady of the Republic of El Salvador (Spanish: Primera dama de El Salvador) is the title attributed to the wife (or designee) of the President of El Salvador. The office of First Lady coordinates protocol and social affairs within the presidency and promotes domestic social programs. To date, there has been no "First Gentleman" of El Salvador. 

The country's current first lady is Gabriela Rodríguez de Bukele, wife of President Nayib Bukele, who has held the position since 1 June 2019.

Partial list of first ladies (since 1934)
Partial list of first ladies since Concepción Monteagudo, wife of President Maximiliano Hernández Martínez, in 1931.

References

El Salvador